Reduced nicotinamide adenine dinucleotide-coenzyme Q reductase may stand for
 NADH dehydrogenase
 NADH:ubiquinone reductase (non-electrogenic)